Siobhan Stagg (born 16 September 1987) is an Australian operatic lyric-coloratura soprano.

Biography
Stagg was born in Mildura to school teacher parents, and has two brothers. She completed her tertiary education at the University of Melbourne 2009 and Wales International Academy of Voice in Cardiff. 

She was the winner of the 2012 First Prize and Audience Choice awards at The Mietta Song Competition.  

She has appeared with the Salzburg Festival, the Berliner Staatsoper, the Bavarian State Opera, the Deutsche Oper Berlin, the Berlin Philharmonic, the Hamburg State Opera, the Royal Opera Covent Garden, Glyndebourne Festival Opera, Opernhaus Zürich, Opéra de Dijon, the Lyric Opera of Chicago and Victorian Opera. In 2020, she joined the board of directors with the Melba Opera Trust.

Stagg currently lives in Berlin with her partner Nelson.

References

External links

"Siobhan Stagg’s unique musical response to the pandemic" by Clive Paget. Limelight, 25 September 2020 

1987 births
People from Mildura
Australian operatic sopranos
Living people